Rudolph Gerhardus Snyman (born 29 January 1995) is a South African professional rugby union player who currently plays for the South Africa national team and Irish province Munster in the United Rugby Championship. His regular position is lock. Snyman was part of the South Africa team that won a record-equalling third Rugby World Cup in 2019.

Youth

He then represented them at the 2011 Under-16 Grant Khomo Week in East London, where he scored a try in their match against Boland.
Snyman also represented them at the 2013 Under-18 Craven Week tournament in Polokwane, where he made three appearances. After the tournament, Snyman was selected in the South Africa Schools team that played three matches against European counterparts in August 2013; he started their matches against England, France, and Wales, helping them to victory in all three matches.

Club career

Blue Bulls
After secondary school, Snyman joined the Blue Bulls Academy and represented the  side during the 2014 Under-19 Provincial Championship. He eventually played in ten matches during the regular season, contributing one more try in their match against and helping them to finish top of the league to qualify to the semi-finals. He started both the semi-final – a 43–20 win against the  – and the final, which they lost 26–33 against the hosts in Cape Town.

In 2015, Snyman was included in the  Super Rugby squad prior to the 2015 Super Rugby season despite not having featured in any first class matches up to that point. However, he didn't get any game time and reverted to the squad for the 2015 Vodacom Cup. He made his senior debut in the first match of that competition, a 37–13 victory over Gauteng rivals the in Kempton Park. In June 2015, he extended his contract at the Bulls until October 2017.

Japanese league

Snyman joined Japanese Top Challenge League side Mie Honda Heat for the 2017 Top Challenge League season, where he suffered a knee injury that required surgery. After the 2019 Rugby World Cup, where Snyman was a member of the victorious South African team, he returned to Japanese Top League side Mie Honda Heat.

Munster
Snyman joined Irish United Rugby Championship side Munster, whose head coach was former Springboks forwards coach Johann van Graan at the time. Though his two-year contract with province didn't commence until 1 July 2020, Snyman arrived in Ireland in May 2020 following the cancellation of the remainder of the 2019–20 Top League due to Covid-19. Snyman made his debut for Munster in their 27–25 defeat against Leinster on 22 August 2020, though his first appearance for the province lasted only 7 minutes after he suffered a torn ACL during a lineout. Snyman was nearing a return from the injury, but suffered a setback during his rehabilitation that required minor surgery. In a further blow, Snyman also sustained substantial burns following a firepit accident.

Snyman made his long-awaited return from injury in Munster's opening 2021–22 United Rugby Championship fixture against the Sharks on 25 September 2021, coming on as a replacement for Fineen Wycherley in their 42–17 win against the South African side, and scored his first try for the province one week later in their 34–18 win against the Stormers. In what was only his third game back for Munster, and his fourth appearance overall for the province, Snyman suffered a re-rupture of his cruciate ligament ten minutes after coming on as a 51st minute replacement for Thomas Ahern in Munster's 43–13 win against Welsh side Scarlets on 10 October 2021, and endured another long spell out of the game. Snyman signed a two-year contract extension with Munster in January 2022. After 17 months out, Snyman made his return from injury on 3 March 2023 when he came off the bench in Munster's 2022–23 United Rugby Championship round 15 fixture at home to Scarlets, replacing Jean Kleyn during the second-half of Munster's 49–42 win.

International career

South Africa under-20s

Snyman was named in a 37-man training squad for the South Africa national under-20 rugby union team and featured for them in a friendly match against a Varsity Cup Dream Team in April 2015. Despite missing out on their two-match tour of Argentina, he was named in the final squad for the 2015 World Rugby Under 20 Championship upon the team's return. He started all three of their matches in Pool B of the competition; a 33–5 win against hosts Italy, a 40–8 win against Samoa and a 46–13 win over Australia to help South Africa finish top of Pool B to qualify for the semi-finals with the best record pool stage of all the teams in the competition. Snyman started their semi-final match against England, but could not prevent them losing 20–28 to be eliminated from the competition by England for the second year in succession and also started their third-place play-off match against France, helping South Africa to a 31–18 win to secure third place in the competition.

South Africa 'A'

In 2016, Snyman was included in a South Africa 'A' squad that played a two-match series against a touring England Saxons team. He came on as a replacement in their first match in Bloemfontein, but ended on the losing side as the visitors ran out 32–24 winners. He then started the second match of the series, a 26–29 defeat to the Saxons in George.

South Africa
Snyman was named in South Africa's squad for the 2019 Rugby World Cup. He played all 7 games, mainly off the bench, and scored his first test try against Italy. South Africa won the tournament, defeating England in the final. Despite an injury-disrupted 2020–21 season and burns sustained during a firepit accident, Snyman was selected by head coach Jacques Nienaber in South Africa's squad for the 2021 British & Irish Lions tour to South Africa, however, the aforementioned burns required a skin graft, ruling Snyman out of the series. He initially returned to Munster for his rehabilitation, but rejoined the South Africa squad for the 2021 Rugby Championship. After suffering a knee ligament re-rupture during his comeback for Munster, Snyman was ruled out of South Africa's 2021 end-of-year tour.

References

External links

Munster Profile

URC Profile

Living people
1995 births
Rugby union players from Potchefstroom
South African rugby union players
Blue Bulls players
Bulls (rugby union) players
Mie Honda Heat players
Munster Rugby players
South Africa Under-20 international rugby union players
South Africa international rugby union players
South African expatriate rugby union players
South African expatriate sportspeople in Ireland
Expatriate rugby union players in Ireland
Rugby union locks